"Was zählt" (What counts) is a song by Die Toten Hosen. It's the first single and the third track from the album Auswärtsspiel.

The song is an ode to love ("Wenn nur die Liebe zählt" - When only love matters), as it describes, how one can go through anything and suffer a lot for love, also give up any memories for it.

Music video
The music video was directed by Ralf Schmerberg. It shows the band performing the song in a room in a city building. Also the streets outside are shown, which are overflowing with police, as the video was shot a while after the September 11 attacks.

Track listing
 "Was zählt" (What counts) (Breitkopf, von Holst/Frege) − 4:37
 "Hängt ihn höher" (Hang him higher) (Meurer/Frege) - 2:37
 "Drüber reden" (Talking about it) (von Holst/Frege) – 1:42
 "Schöner warten" (Nicer waiting) (Frege/Frege) – 3:58

Charts

2001 singles
Die Toten Hosen songs
Songs written by Campino (singer)
Songs written by Andreas von Holst
Songs written by Michael Breitkopf
2001 songs